The  2002 ASP World Tour is a professional competitive surfing league.  It is run by the Association of Surfing Professionals.

Men's World Tour

Tournaments
Source

Final standings
Source

Women's World Tour

Tournaments
Source

Final standings
Source

External links
 Official Site

World Surf League
ASP World Tour